Gilfachrheda or Gilfachreda is a village in the  community of Llanarth, Ceredigion, Wales, at the confluence of two small rivers, the Afon Gido and the Afon Llethy.

Notable resident
From 1937 until 1958, Alastair Hugh Graham (1904–1982) lived as a recluse at Plas-y-Wern Lodge, Gilfachrheda.

References

External links

Villages in Ceredigion